Angelo Samuel Chaves (born 10 February 2001) is a Brazilian professional footballer who plays as a left back for Portuguesa, on loan from Coritiba.

Career statistics

References

2001 births
Living people
Footballers from Curitiba
Brazilian footballers
Association football defenders
Campeonato Brasileiro Série A players
Campeonato Brasileiro Série B players
Coritiba Foot Ball Club players
Brusque Futebol Clube players
Associação Portuguesa de Desportos players